John Hoppner  (4 April 175823 January 1810) was an English portrait painter, much influenced by Reynolds, who achieved fame as a brilliant colourist.

Early life

Hoppner was born in Whitechapel, London, the son of German parents – his mother was one of the German attendants at the royal palace. King George showed a fatherly interest and patronage of the young boy that gave rise to rumours, quite unfounded, that he may have been his illegitimate son.

Hoppner became a chorister at the royal chapel, but, showing strong inclination for art, in 1775 he entered the Royal Academy. In 1778 he took a silver medal for drawing from life, and in 1782 the Academy's highest award, the gold medal for historical painting, his subject being King Lear.

Career
Hoppner first exhibited at the Royal Academy in 1780. His earliest love was for landscape, but necessity obliged him to turn to the more lucrative business of portrait painting. At once successful, he had throughout life the most fashionable and wealthy sitters, and was the greatest rival to the growing attraction of Thomas Lawrence. He rarely attempted ideal subjects, though a Sleeping Venus, Belisarius, Jupiter and Io, a Bacchante and Cupid and Psyche are recorded among his works. The Prince of Wales visited him especially often, and many of his finest portraits were hung in the state apartments at St James's Palace, notably those of the prince himself, the Duke and Duchess of York, Lord Rodney and Lord Nelson. His other sitters included Sir Walter Scott, the Duke of Wellington, Henry Bartle Frere and Sir George Beaumont.

According to the 1911 edition of the Encyclopædia Britannica:
Competent judges have deemed his most successful works to be his portraits of women and children... He was confessedly an imitator of Reynolds. When first painted, his works were much admired for the brilliancy and harmony of their colouring, but the injury due to destructive mediums and lapse of time which many of them suffered caused a great depreciation in his reputation. The appearance, however, of some of his pictures in good condition has shown that his fame as a brilliant colourist was well-founded. His drawing is faulty, but his touch has qualities of breadth and freedom that give to his paintings a faint reflection of the charm of Reynolds.

In 1803 he published A Series of Portraits of Ladies, engraved after his paintings by Charles Wilkin, and in 1805 a volume of translations of Eastern tales into English verse.

Unusually Hoppner painted the background and perhaps more of a full-length portrait of Charlotte, Countess Talbot by Thomas Gainsborough in 1788, the year in which Gainsborough died. It is now in the Dunedin Public Art Gallery.

Personal life
Hoppner was a man of great social power, and had the knowledge and accomplishments of a man of the world.

He married Phoebe Wright, the daughter of American-born sculptor Patience Wright.  They had five children, although little is known about the youngest:
 Catherine Hampden Hoppner (1784–1828), Magistrate, East India Company
 Richard Belgrave Hoppner (1786–1872), British Consul general, Venice, and friend of Byron (ref: Oxford DNB, entry on RBH in entry on John Hoppner) 
 Wilson (sometimes known as William) Lascelles Hoppner (1788-?), artist
 Henry Parkyns Hoppner (1795–1833), officer of the Royal Navy, Arctic explorer, draughtsman/artist
 youngest unknown Hoppner

Death
In his later years Hoppner suffered from a chronic disease of the liver. He died on 23 January 1810.

Gallery

References

Further reading
Hoppner, John. Oriental Tales (London: J. Hatchard, 1805).

Cole, Timothy. Old English Masters (New York : The Century Co., 1902) p. 91 ff.
Skipton, H. P. K. John Hoppner (Methuen & Co, 1905)
McKay, William & Roberts, William. John Hoppner (John Lane, The Bodley Head, 1909)
Wilson, John, John Hoppner entry in Oxford DNB.

External links

 
John Hoppner on ArtCyclopedia
 Profile on Royal Academy of Arts Collections
The Sackville children (1796 painting)
Portrait of William Locke (1783 painting)
Portrait of Anne, Lady Grenville (Christie's)

1758 births
1810 deaths
People from Whitechapel
Painters from London
18th-century English painters
English male painters
19th-century English painters
English people of German descent
English portrait painters
Royal Academicians
19th-century English male artists
18th-century English male artists
Deaths from liver disease